Elections to New Forest District Council were held on 6 May 1999.  The whole council was up for election and the Conservative party gained overall control of the council from the Liberal Democrat party.

Election result

|}

Ward results

References

1999
1999 English local elections
1990s in Hampshire